The 2011–12 Western Illinois Leathernecks men's basketball team represented Western Illinois University in the 2011–12 NCAA Division I men's basketball season. The Leathernecks, led by head coach Jim Molinari, played their home games at Western Hall in Macomb, Illinois, as members of the Summit League. After finishing 4th in the Summit during the regular season, the Leathernecks made a run to the championship game of the Summit League tournament, where they were defeated by South Dakota State.

Western Illinois failed to qualify for the NCAA tournament, but received a bid to the 2012 College Basketball Invitational, the first postseason bid in program history since moving to Division I for the 1981–82 season. The Leathernecks were eliminated in the first round of the CBI by Oregon State, 80–59.

Roster 

Source

Schedule and results

|-
!colspan=9 style=|Regular season

|-
!colspan=9 style=| Summit League tournament

|-
!colspan=9 style=| CBI

Source

References

Western Illinois Leathernecks men's basketball seasons
Western Illinois
Western Illinois
Western Illinois Leathernecks men's basketball
Western Illinois Leathernecks men's basketball